Darren Beck (born 14 July 1978) is an Australian professional golfer who currently plays on the Asian Tour.

Beck was born in South Africa and moved to Australia at the age of seven. He turned professional in 2004. He won the PGA Tour of Australasia's qualifying school in 2004 and played on the PGA Tour of Australasia in 2005 and 2007. He won the Queensland PGA Championship in 2008 in Australia. Beck joined the Asian Tour in 2008 after going through qualifying school in 2007. He finished in 29th on the Order of Merit in his rookie season and recorded a runner-up finish at the Hero Honda Indian Open. He won his first tour event in 2009 at the Brunei Open in dramatic fashion. Beck was six strokes off the lead going into the final round and shot a 65 (−6) on Sunday to force a playoff with Gaganjeet Bhullar and Boonchu Ruangkit. Boonchu was eliminated on the second playoff hole and Beck won the tournament on the third playoff hole when he sunk a 10-foot birdie putt while Bhullar could only par the hole.

Professional wins (3)

Asian Tour wins (1)

Asian Tour playoff record (1–0)

PGA Tour of Australasia wins (1)

Other wins (1)

Team appearances
Amateur
Australian Men's Interstate Teams Matches (representing New South Wales): 2004

References

External links

Australian male golfers
Asian Tour golfers
PGA Tour of Australasia golfers
1978 births
Living people